Bad Karma is a cult horror short film directed by Underground movie director Alex Chandon and stars Carmel and Dan Barton.

Synopsis
The movie is about status - variously Krishnas, silly sophomores and rampaging proles.

Plot
When Dave Jackson celebrates with his friends a garden party, he crosses two bloodthirsty Hare Krishna followers on his doorstep. The two torches not long and provide for hefty blood flow, recently Dave called the emergency alert, which fortunately, run and walk in a SM-Studio the cult berserkers with the appropriate tool in the neck...

Cast
 Julius Barnet as Dave Jackson
 Carmel as Hana
 Lotu as Mr. Jackson
 M. Karapateas	as Mrs. Jackson
 Adrian Nudel as Partygoer
 Ben Perkins as Partygoer
 Marcus Raven as Partygoer / Shape shifter / S&M Client
 Joe Carrier as Partygoer
 Ben Bethel as Shape Shifter Leader
 Dan Barton as Shape Shifter Leader
 Jon Raven as Shape Shifter
 Oysten Shirley as Shape Shifter
 Ollie Bond as Shape Shifter
 Bill Corbett as Sado-Masochist
 Alex Chandon as Shape Shifter
 Ian Duds as Shape Shifter
 Edward Cunningham as Shape Shifter / Bubba
 Neil Keenan as Shape Shifter / Goffer
 Julian Portinari as Anthony
 Carla Linley as S & M Girl
 Estelle Ross as S & M Girl
 Saul Brignell	as J.T. Rosebucket

Release
The film is part of the SOI Film Entertainment DVD, who was released with Chainsaw Scumfuck and Drillbit on one Disc.

References

External links

1991 films
British anthology films
British horror short films
1991 horror films
Films directed by Alex Chandon
1990s English-language films
1990s British films